Mathiassen may refer to:

Erik Mathiassen Enge (1852–1933), Norwegian politician
Samuel Mathiassen Føyn (1786–1854), Norwegian ship-owner and politician
Idar Mathiassen (born 1976), Norwegian footballer
Therkel Mathiassen (1892–1967), archaeologist, anthropologist, cartographer and ethnographer
Gotskalk Mathiassen Seim (1818–1873), Norwegian politician

See also
Mathiassen Mountain, on Southampton Island in the Canadian territory of Nunavut
Mathiasen
Mathiasin
Mathiesen
Mathieson